William Howard Harsha Jr. (January 1, 1921 – October 11, 2010) was an American politician who represented Ohio as a  Republican in the United States House of Representatives from January 3, 1961, to January 3, 1981.

Biography
Born in Portsmouth, Ohio, he graduated from Portsmouth High School in 1939. He received his B.A. from Kenyon College in Gambier, Ohio, in 1943, where he was initiated into Sigma Pi fraternity, and his LL.B. from Western Reserve University in Cleveland, Ohio, in 1947. From 1942 to 1944, he was in the United States Marine Corps.

After his admission to the bar on March 6, 1947, he was the city of Portsmouth's assistant solicitor until 1951, when he was elected Scioto County Prosecuting Attorney. He served one four-year term. In 1961, he was elected to Congress and served twenty years there. He was succeeded by Bob McEwen, who had managed two of his re-election campaigns.
After his retirement from Congress, he was a consultant in Washington, D.C., from 1981 to 1986, when he returned to Portsmouth and resumed his law practice.

Death
He died in 2010 in Portsmouth, Ohio, aged 89.

Legacy
An artificial lake on the East Fork of the Little Miami River in Clermont County near Batavia is named for him (see East Fork State Park), as is the William H. Harsha Bridge, which spans the Ohio River between Ohio and Kentucky.

Family
Harsha's son, William H. Harsha III, is a judge of the Ohio Court of Appeals for the Fourth Appellate District.

Notes

References

1921 births
2010 deaths
Case Western Reserve University School of Law alumni
United States Marine Corps personnel of World War II
County district attorneys in Ohio
Kenyon College alumni
People from Portsmouth, Ohio
United States Marines
20th-century American politicians
Republican Party members of the United States House of Representatives from Ohio